Tim Elliott may refer to

 Tim Elliott, American martial artist
 Tim Elliott (earth scientist)
 Tim Elliott (footballer) (born 1976)